Marcella Lista is a French curator and art historian. She is chief curator at the Centre Pompidou.

Career 
In 2004 she was responsible for the  contemporary art and architecture program. With Sophie Duplaix she curated the exhibition Sons & Lumières, A history of sound in 20th Century at the Centre Pompidou. In 2011 she was in residency at the Villa Médicis to research "dance, modernity and abstraction, 1910-1930". Lista is the chief curator of the New Media Collection at the Centre Pompidou since 2016. She curated the two inaugural exhibitions at the Centre Pompidou x West Bund Museum The Shape of Time, Highlights of the Centre Pompidou Collection and Observations, Highlights of the New Media Collection in 2019.

Bibliography (selection) 

 Sons et Lumières : une histoire du son dans l’art du 20e siècle (co-dirrection), catalogue de l’exposition, Paris, ed. du centre Georges Pompidou, 2004.
 L’œuvre d’art totale à la naissance des avant-gardes (1908-1914), Paris, Éditions de l’Institut National d’Histoire de l’Art, 2006.
 Corps étrangers : danse, dessin, film, Lyon et Paris, Fage Editions et musée du Louvre, 2006.
 Paul Klee, 1879-1940 : polyphonies. Arles: Actes Sud, 2011. 
Suzanne Lafont: Situations. La Garenne Colombes: Bernard Chauveau Editeur, 2015. 
Ryoji Ikeda : Continuum. Paris: Xavier Barral Editeur, 2018.

References

External links 
 Marcella Lista at the Centre Pompidou

Living people
21st-century French women
French art historians
French art curators
Year of birth missing (living people)
French women curators